The Roman Catholic Diocese of Colón-Kuna Yala (erected 15 December 1988 as the Diocese of Colón, renamed 13 June 1997) is a suffragan diocese of the Archdiocese of Panamá.

Ordinaries
Carlos María Ariz Bolea, C.M.F. (1988–2005)
Audilio Aguilar Aguilar (2005–2013), appointed Bishop of Santiago de Veraguas
 Manuel Ochogavía Barahona, O.S.A. (2014–present)

See also
Catholic Church in Panama

References

External links
 

Colon-Kuna Yala
Colon-Kuna Yala
Colon-Kuna Yala
Roman Catholic Ecclesiastical Province of Panamá